David Kidd may refer to:

David Campbell Kidd (1889–1954), New Zealand politician
David Kidd (writer) (1926–1996), American writer interested in China and Japan
David Kidd (athlete) in 2004 IAAF World Race Walking Cup
Dave Kidd (musician) from The Muckrakers
David Kidd (screenwriter) of The Swinging Cheerleaders
David Kidd, one of the Scots to be transported from Leith to American plantations aboard the St. Michael of Scarborough, 1678